Troitskoye is a rural locality (a selo) in Troitsky Selsoviet of Ivanovsky District, Amur Oblast, Russia. The population was 406 as of 2018. There are 8 streets.

Geography 
Troitskoye is located on the left bank of the Belaya River, 58 km north of Ivanovka (the district's administrative centre) by road. Srednebelaya is the nearest rural locality.

References 

Rural localities in Ivanovsky District, Amur Oblast